Whistle Blower is a 2014 South Korean film directed by Yim Soon-rye.

Though fictionalized, the film is based on real-life scientist Hwang Woo-suk, who was at the center of one of the largest investigations of scientific fraud in recent memory. Hwang, then a professor of biotechnology at Seoul National University (SNU), gained international renown in 2004 after claiming that he had successfully carried out experiments cloning human embryonic stem cells. In 2005, an anonymous tip from whistleblower Ryu Young-joon, a former researcher at Hwang's lab, led to MBC program PD Notebook uncovering Hwang's ethical violations and fabricated data, which was confirmed by an SNU investigative panel in 2006. Hwang's research was discredited and in 2009, a South Korean court convicted him of embezzlement and bioethical violations.

Plot
TV news producer Yoon Min-cheol is desperate for a scoop for his investigative journalism program PD Chase. One day, he receives a tip that The Newman Medical, the biggest sterility clinic in Korea, buys ova illegally. But while investigating, he is shocked to discover that scientist Lee Jang-hwan seems to be involved in the case. Lee had gained widespread acclaim and press attention following his groundbreaking experiments cloning human embryonic stem cells, and is considered a national hero whose research may mean the cure to several illnesses. As Yoon hesitates whether to pursue such a revered and powerful figure, he gets an anonymous call from Shim Min-ho, a young scientist who works for Lee's lab. Shim claims that Lee's stem cell research has largely been fabricated and unethical, and the two join forces to expose Lee's scientific fraud and bring the truth to the public, despite its disbelieving and harsh reaction.

Cast
 Park Hae-il as Yoon Min-cheol
 Yoo Yeon-seok as Shim Min-ho
 Lee Geung-young as Lee Jang-hwan
 Park Won-sang as Lee Sung-ho
 Ryu Hyun-kyung as Kim Mi-hyeon
 Song Ha-yoon as Kim Yi-seul
 Kim Kang-hyeon as Lee Do-hyeong 
 Kim Soo-an as Shim Soo-bin 
 Kim Joong-ki as Priest Park 
 Nam Myeong-ryeol as Professor Yoo Jong-jin 
 Hwang Jae-won as Park Soo-hyeon 
 Park Ji-so as Yoon Ji-ho
 Jang Gwang as President of broadcasting station 
 Kwon Hae-hyo as General manager of broadcasting station 
 Choi Yong-min as Minister of Science and Technology
 Han Gi-joong as Government administration director 
 Jeon Su-ji as Researcher
 Kim Won-hae as Taxi driver in the middle of the night
 Lee Mi-do as Yoon Min-cheol's wife
 Kim Young-jae as Press conference moderator 
 Hwang Jeong-min  as Middle-aged woman in a shanty

Box office
It dropped to third place on its second and third weeks, earning  from 1.7 million admissions.

Awards and nominations

References

External links 
  
  
 
 
 

2014 films
2010s Korean-language films
South Korean drama films
Drama films based on actual events
Films directed by Yim Soon-rye
2010s South Korean films